Petrel Island is an island 1.2 km (0.75 miles) southwest of Prion Island, lying in the Bay of Isles, South Georgia. First charted in 1912-13 by Robert Cushman Murphy, American naturalist aboard the brig Daisy. Recharted in 1929-30 by DI personnel, who so named it because of its association with Prion Island. Prions have been observed in these islands.

See also 
 List of Antarctic and sub-Antarctic islands

Islands of South Georgia